The World Friendship was a professional golf tournament held in Japan in the early 1970s. The event was held at the Horyuji Country Club in Ikaruga, Nara. 

The second tournament was won by Taiwan's Hsieh Yung-yo, who came from a stroke behind 54-hole leader, New Zealand's Terry Kendall, to claim first prize.

In its final year, the event was part of the inaugural season of the Japan Golf Tour. Another Taiwanese, Lu Liang-Huan ("Mr. Lu"), won the event. He defeated Australia's Graham Marsh and Japan's Isao Aoki in a playoff.

Winners

References

Former Japan Golf Tour events
Defunct golf tournaments in Japan
Sport in Nara Prefecture
Recurring sporting events established in 1971
Recurring sporting events disestablished in 1973
1971 establishments in Japan
1973 disestablishments in Japan